Kinect Rush: A Disney–Pixar Adventure, later remastered as Rush: A Disney–Pixar Adventure, is a 2012 platform video game based on Pixar films, released for Kinect on Xbox 360. Announced on March 8, 2012 and released later that month, the game is similar to Kinect: Disneyland Adventures, but players instead are taken through the worlds of eight (later nine) of Pixar's movies: Up, Toy Story, Toy Story 2, Toy Story 3, The Incredibles, Cars, Cars 2, Ratatouille, and (in a 2017 remaster) Finding Dory with the game hub set in a local park.

In August 2017 at Gamescom 2017, Microsoft announced that Rush: A Disney–Pixar Adventure (without the Kinect name) would be remastered and re-released for Xbox One and Microsoft Windows 10. The remaster, which was released on October 31, 2017, supports 4K resolution, high dynamic range visuals, traditional controls alongside Kinect for Xbox One, enhancements for Xbox One X and adds a new world based on the 2016 Pixar film Finding Dory.

The game features characters from Pixar movies up to Toy Story 3, as it was released 3 months before Brave.

Gameplay

In Rush: A Disney–Pixar Adventure, you begin by creating an avatar with your Kinect Sensor. Your avatar changes based on the Pixar film you are playing. For example, a car in Cars or a superhero in The Incredibles. The game takes place in third-person and the levels being in a action-adventure take. Most the gameplay consists of collecting coins, getting a high score, and performing specific tasks.

Reception
Review aggregator Metacritic gave the game a rating of 68, which indicates "mixed or average reviews".

Reviewer Steven Hopper of IGN gave the game a rating of 6, saying that the game is "sure to give kids plenty of exercise", but "control issues make for an frustrating experience at best".

References

2012 video games
Kinect games
Microsoft games
Xbox 360 games
Crossover video games
Disney video games
The Incredibles video games
Cars (franchise) video games
Toy Story video games
Video games based on films
Video games developed in France
Video games with alternative versions
Windows games
Xbox One games
3D platform games
Asobo Studio games
Single-player video games